Asimov's SF Adventure Magazine was a science fiction magazine which lasted from late 1978 to late 1979. It was published by Davis Publications out of New York City and was edited by George H. Scithers. After releasing only four issues, and losing some $50,000, publisher Joel Davis decided to cease publication of Asimov's SF Adventure Magazine.

Famous contributors
Poul Anderson
Isaac Asimov
John Brunner
Samuel R. Delany
Alan Dean Foster
Joe Haldeman
Barry B. Longyear
Roger Zelazny

Magazines with similar names
In 1977 Asimov's Science Fiction began publication as a digest size science fiction magazine called Asimov's Science Fiction Magazine.  Unlike Asimov's SF Adventure Magazine it remains in print to this day.

See also
 List of defunct American periodicals

References 

 
 http://www.locusmag.com/

Defunct science fiction magazines published in the United States
Magazines established in 1978
Magazines disestablished in 1979
Science fiction magazines established in the 1970s
Magazines published in New York City